George Hunt may refer to:

Sport
George Hunt (American football) (born 1949), American football player
George Hunt (footballer, born 1910) (1910–1996), English international footballer for Tottenham Hotspur and Arsenal
George Hunt (footballer, born 1922) (1922–1987), English footballer for Swindon Town

George E. Hunt (1896–1959), medium-pace bowler who made over 200 appearances for Somerset
George R. Hunt (1873–1960), right-handed batsman who made one appearance for Somerset
George Hunt (rower) (1916–1999), American rower

Others
George Hunt (artist) (1933-2020), American expressionist painter 
George Hunt (attorney) (1841–1901), American politician
George Hunt (ethnologist) (1854–1933), Canadian ethnologist
George Hunt (editor) (1918-1991), American editor
George Hunt (merchant) (1845–1911), store proprietor in Adelaide, South Australia
George Hunt (trombonist) (1906–1946), American jazz trombonist
George Edward Hunt (jeweller) (1892–1960), Birmingham Arts and Crafts jeweller
George F. Hunt (1831–1888), American politician and physician
George W. P. Hunt (1859–1934), first Governor of the State of Arizona
George Ward Hunt (1825–1877), British politician
George Hunt (British Army officer) (1830–1882), credited as the founder of Huntsville, Ontario, Canada
George Hunt (Royal Navy officer) (1916–2011), highly decorated Second World War submarine commander
George Hunt (MP) (died 1798), British politician
George Nelson Hunt III (born 1931), Episcopal bishop of Rhode Island
G. W. Hunt (George William Hunt, 1837–1904), English writer of music hall songs